Mateo Ponte Costa (born 24 May 2003) is a Uruguayan professional footballer who plays as a right-back for Danubio.

Career
A youth academy graduate of Danubio, Ponte made his professional debut on 4 February 2021 in a 4–0 league win against River Plate Montevideo.

Ponte is a current Uruguayan youth international.

Career statistics

References

External links
 

2003 births
Living people
Footballers from Montevideo
Association football defenders
Uruguayan footballers
Uruguayan Primera División players
Danubio F.C. players